Established in 1863, Hampshire County Cricket Club has played List A cricket since 1963 to the present day.  This is a list of Hampshire List A cricket records; that is, record team and individual performances in List A cricket for Hampshire County Cricket Club.

Team
 Highest Total For: 396/5 v Kent at County Cricket Ground, Beckenham, 2022
 Highest Total Against: 360/7 by Somerset at Ageas Bowl, Southampton, 2018
 Lowest Total For: 43 v Essex at May's Bounty, Basingstoke, 1972
 Lowest Total Against: 61 by Somerset at Recreation Ground, Bath, 1973

Batting
 Highest Score: 190 James Vince v Gloucestershire, Ageas Bowl, Southampton, 2019
 Most Runs in Season: 1,004 Chris Smith, 1991

Most List A runs for Hampshire
Qualification - 6,000 runs

Highest Partnership for each wicket
Correct as of the end of the 2022 Royal London One-Day Cup

Bowling
 Best Bowling: 7/30 Peter Sainsbury v Norfolk at County Ground, Southampton, 1965
 Wickets in Season: 51, Shaun Udal, 1992

Most List A wickets for Hampshire

Qualification - 200 wickets

References

See also
 List of Hampshire CCC first-class cricket records
 List of Hampshire CCC Twenty20 cricket records

Hampshire
Hampshire County Cricket Club
Cricket